Megaceryle is a genus of very large kingfishers. They have a wide distribution in the Americas, Africa, and Southeast Asia.

The genus was erected by German naturalist Johann Jakob Kaup in 1848. The type species is a subspecies of the crested kingfisher, Megaceryle lugubris guttulata. Megaceryle is from the Ancient Greek megas, "great", and the existing genus Ceryle.

Species
The genus comprises four species:

All are specialist fish-eaters with prominent stiff crests on their heads. They have dark grey or bluish-grey upperparts, largely unmarked in the two American species, but heavily spotted with white in the Asian crested kingfisher and the African giant kingfisher. The underparts may be white or rufous, and all forms have a contrasting breast band except male ringed kingfisher. The underpart pattern is always different for the two sexes of each species.

These birds nest in horizontal tunnels made in a river bank or sand bank. Both parents excavate the tunnel, incubate the eggs, and feed the young.

Megaceryle kingfishers are often seen perched prominently on trees, posts, or other suitable watch-points close to water before plunging in headfirst after their  prey, usually  fish, crustaceans, or frogs, but sometimes aquatic insects and other suitably sized animals.

Origins and taxonomy
The previous view that the Megaceryle kingfishers arose in the New World from a specialist fish-eating alcedinid ancestor that crossed the Bering Strait and gave rise to this genus and the American green kingfishers Chloroceryle, with a large crested species later, in the Pliocene, crossing the Atlantic Ocean to give rise to the giant and crested kingfishers  is probably wrong. Rather, it now seems that the genus probably originates in the Old World, possibly Africa, and the ancestor of the belted and ringed kingfishers made the ocean crossing 

The Megaceryle kingfishers were formerly placed in Ceryle with the pied kingfisher, but the latter is genetically closer to the American green kingfishers.

References

 
Bird genera